Polypodium virginianum, commonly known as rock polypody, rock cap fern, or common polypody, is a small evergreen species of fern native to the Eastern United States and Canada. It generally grows on rocks and occasionally on tree roots in nature.

Description
Leaves are evergreen, oblong and pinnatifid with acuminate tips.

Large, circular sori are prominently featured on the underside of fertile fronds in late summer and autumn. Sporangia are intermixed with long brown glandular hairs.

Taxonomy
Polypodium virginianum has several synonyms including: P. vinlandicum A. Love & D. Love, P. vulgare L. var. americanum Hooker, P. vulgare L. var. virginianum (L.) D. C. Eaton. It is generally treated as distinct, though some have recommended it is equally well treated as a North American variety of the circumboreal Polypodium vulgare.

This species is an allotetraploid of hybrid origin, the parents being Polypodium appalachianum and P. sibiricum.

Distribution and habitat 
Polypodium virginianum typically grows on boulders, cliffs, and rocky slopes and does not need well-developed soil. It is common throughout eastern North America; its native distribution ranges from Newfoundland to Yukon south to Georgia, Alabama, and Arkansas.

References

virginianum
Ferns of the Americas
Ferns of the United States
Flora of North America
Plants described in 1753
Taxa named by Carl Linnaeus